Paul Graham was an Australian professional wrestler bodybuilder and president of the Australian IFBB bodybuilding federation.

Arnold Schwarzenegger was best man at Paul Graham’s wedding.

References

External links
 
 

Australian male professional wrestlers
Australian bodybuilders
Sportsmen from New South Wales
Living people
Sportspeople from Sydney
Year of birth missing (living people)